Prince of Pirates is a 1953 American Technicolor adventure film directed by Sidney Salkow.

Plot

Cast

John Derek: Prince Roland 
Barbara Rush: Countess Nita Orde
Carla Balenda: Princess Maria
Whitfield Connor: King Stephan
Edgar Barrier: Count Blanco
Robert Shayne: Prime Minister Treeg
Harry Lauter: Jan
Don C. Harvey: Koepke (as Don Harvey)
Henry Rowland: Greb 
Britt Lomond: Brenner (as Glase Lohman)
Gene Roth: Captain Brock

Comic book adaptation
 Eastern Color Movie Love #19 (February 1953)

References

External links

Review of film at Variety

1950s historical adventure films
American swashbuckler films
Films directed by Sidney Salkow
Films set in the 16th century
Films set in Europe
Columbia Pictures films
Films adapted into comics
American historical adventure films
1950s English-language films
1950s American films